Michael Harris Greene (November 4, 1933 – January 10, 2020) was an American actor who was active from the 1960s through the 1990s.

Career
Greene was born in San Francisco, California, the son of Gladys and Harry Greene. Early in his career, Greene was frequently featured in westerns, and was credited with over 100 television and film appearances, including the 1962 film This is Not a Test (as Mike Green). In October of 1966, he appeared as the character, Nubu, in the episode, Space Circus, of the TV series, Lost in Space, as well as a leading role in the 1973 film The Clones. He played Jimmy Hart, William Petersen's ill-fated partner in To Live and Die in L.A..
He is perhaps best remembered in his co-starring role as Deputy U.S. Marshal Vance Porter in the short-lived ABC-Warner Brothers western series The Dakotas, where he co-starred with Larry Ward, Jack Elam, and Chad Everett. The series was controversially cancelled by ABC after only 19 episodes were aired during 1963.

Greene died in Maui, Hawaii in January 2020, at the age of 86.

Filmography

References

External links

1933 births
2020 deaths
20th-century American male actors
American male film actors
Male actors from San Francisco